Arthur A. Dugoni (June 29, 1925 - September 23, 2020) was the former dean of the Arthur A. Dugoni School of Dentistry at University of the Pacific and a national leader in dentistry and dental education.

In addition to heading University of the Pacific's dental school for 28 years, Dugoni served as president of the California Dental Association, the American Dental Association, the American Dental Education Association and the American Board of Orthodontics. He presented some 1,000 lectures, papers, clinics and essays during his career, and published more than 175 articles.

Dugoni championed a humanistic approach to dental education, one that became a model for the nation. He also worked to address the high cost of dental education, and led dental licensure reform at the state and national levels.

Early life and education 

Dugoni grew up in San Francisco as one of three children of Arthur B. and Lina Dugoni, who were immigrants from Italy. In a 2011 interview published in Inside Dentistry, he recalled that everyone on the block was a relative and that the whole family came together every Sunday to eat, tell stories and sing operas.

He graduated as valedictorian from St. James High School in San Francisco, which later merged with Riordan, and then began college at the age of 17 at the University of San Francisco. With the war, he transferred to Gonzaga University in Spokane, Washington, where he met his future wife, Katherine A. Groo, who attended Holy Names Academy. Dugoni graduated as valedictorian from Gonzaga in 1944.

Career 

Persuaded by the family dentist to follow in his footsteps, the young Dugoni enrolled in dental school at the University of Missouri–Kansas City before completing his D.D.S. degree at the College of Physicians and Surgeons in San Francisco, the school that would later be named in his honor. In 1948, Dugoni delivered the valedictory address to his fellow dentists at the school.

After launching a successful clinical practice, Dugoni returned to the dental school in 1951 as assistant professor of operative dentistry. He held several other faculty positions, including professor and chair of the Department of Orthodontics. In 1963, he completed his M.S.D. degree in Orthodontics at the University of Washington and then went on to pioneer the primary and mixed dentition orthodontic clinic at University of the Pacific. Dugoni continued to maintain a private orthodontic practice in South San Francisco until 1987.

In 1978, he was appointed dean of the School of Dentistry at University of the Pacific.

On August 28, 2004, when Dugoni was 79, the University honored him for his long and distinguished leadership by renaming the school as the Arthur A. Dugoni School of Dentistry. Some 1,600 guests attended the ceremony, including 22 deans of U.S. dental schools as well as Richard W. Valachovic, longtime executive director of the American Dental Education Association.

Dugoni stepped down as dean in 2006, but continued to be involved with the school and the university as dean emeritus, professor of orthodontics and senior executive for development.

Leadership, honors and awards 
Served as president of the American Dental Association (1988-1989), American Dental Association Foundation; American Association of Dental Schools, and California Dental Association, and as treasurer of the Federation Dentaire Internationale FDI World Dental Federation.

Among his many honors, Dugoni was elected in 1998 to the FDI World Dental Federation List of Honour, which is limited to 30 living individuals worldwide who have made distinguished contributions to international dentistry.  In 2001, he received the William John Gies Award, the highest honor bestowed by the American College of Dentists. The California Dental Association recognized him with its Dale F. Redig Distinguished Service Award in 2003. In 2009, the ADEAGies Foundation honored him with its Award for Outstanding Achievement - Dental Educator. He received honorary doctoral degrees from the University of Detroit; University of Louisville; and Louisiana State University.

Dugoni is a fellow of the American and International College of Dentists and the Academy of Dentistry International, a member of the Pierre Fauchard Academy, and a founding member of the National Academies of Practice. He is an honorary member and fellow of the Academy of General Dentistry and an honorary member of the American Academy of Oral Medicine.

Personal life 

Dugoni and his late wife, Katherine, have seven children, 15 grandchildren and nine great grandchildren.

Dugoni died on September 23, 2020.

References

American orthodontists
University of the Pacific (United States) faculty
2020 deaths
1925 births